Randall William Nosek (born January 8, 1967) is former Major League Baseball pitcher.

External links

1967 births
Living people
American expatriate baseball players in Canada
Baseball players from Nebraska
Bristol Tigers players
Detroit Tigers players
Fayetteville Generals players
Gastonia Tigers players
Lakeland Tigers players
London Tigers players
Major League Baseball pitchers
Sportspeople from Omaha, Nebraska
Toledo Mud Hens players